Zsolt Nagy (born 23 March 1979 in Debrecen) is a Hungarian football player who plays for Szolnoki MÁV FC.

He began playing football with Debreceni VSC in Hungary. After spells with Hajdúszoboszlói SE, Csepel SC, Marcali VFC and Létavértes SE, he moved to the Ukraine. He would play for FC Zakarpattia Uzhhorod and FC Chornomorets Odesa before returning to Hungary to play for Vasas SC in December 2006.

References

External links
Profile at HLSZ.hu
Profile at FFU website

1979 births
Living people
Sportspeople from Debrecen
Hungarian footballers
Hungarian expatriate footballers
Debreceni VSC players
Csepel SC footballers
Vasas SC players
FC Hoverla Uzhhorod players
FC Chornomorets Odesa players
FC Prykarpattia Ivano-Frankivsk (2004) players
Cypriot First Division players
Ukrainian Premier League players
Expatriate footballers in Cyprus
Expatriate footballers in Ukraine
FC Nyva Vinnytsia players
ASIL Lysi players
Hungarian expatriate sportspeople in Ukraine
Hungarian expatriate sportspeople in Cyprus
Association football forwards